Michel Rahme is a Lebanese alpine skier. He competed in three events at the 1964 Winter Olympics.

References

Year of birth missing (living people)
Living people
Lebanese male alpine skiers
Olympic alpine skiers of Lebanon
Alpine skiers at the 1964 Winter Olympics
Place of birth missing (living people)